Douglas Cave is a cave in the British Overseas Territory of Gibraltar.

Description

Location
Douglas Cave is at the bottom of Douglas Path which runs north–south along the top ridge of the Rock of Gibraltar on the road leading up to O'Hara's Battery, all within the Upper Rock Nature Reserve.

History
First occupied during the Great Siege of Gibraltar (1779-1783).  Re-occupied in 1940, the cave is, unusually, inside a brick building and contains a single stone seat and the remains of a simple plaque. The reason for this construction is unknown, although some upper rock camping experts believe it was used to store a high-powered searchlight during WWII.

See also
List of caves in Gibraltar

References

Caves of Gibraltar